The 2013 NAIA Football National Championship was a four-round sixteen team tournament played between November 23 through December 21 of 2013. The tournament concluded on December 21 with a single game played as the 58th Annual Russell Athletic NAIA Football National Championship. The game matched two undefeated teams: #1 Cumberlands Patriots (13-0) against #2 Grand View Vikings.

The championship game was played at Barron Stadium in Rome, Georgia. A total of sixteen teams participated in the single-elimination tournament from across the country. Placement in the tournament was based on the final edition of the 2013 NAIA Coaches' Poll. This year's field included the top 16 teams from the final poll.

Tournament bracket

  * denotes OT.

References

NAIA Football National Championship
Grand View Vikings football
Cumberlands Patriots football
NAIA Football National Championship
NAIA Football National Championship
NAIA Football National Championship